Albert Ulrik Bååth (13 July 1853, in Malmö, Sweden – 2 August 1912, in Gothenburg, Sweden) was a Swedish poet and author, often seen as A.U. Bååth. He was a senior lecturer in Old Norse literature at Göteborgs högskola from 1881 until 1911. He was the brother of Cecilia Bååth-Holmberg.

External links
 

Swedish poets
Swedish male writers
1853 births
1912 deaths
Swedish male poets